Mreg is a settlement in the former Kelmend municipality, Shkodër County, northern Albania.

References

Kelmend (municipality)
Populated places in Malësi e Madhe